Jutta Wachowiak (born 13 December 1940) is a German actress. She has appeared in more than 60 films and television shows since 1962. She starred in the 1986 film So Many Dreams, which was entered into the 37th Berlin International Film Festival.

Selected filmography
 Follow Me, Scoundrels (1964)
 KLK Calling PTZ - The Red Orchestra (1971)
 The Fiancee (1980)
 So Many Dreams (1986)
 The House on the River (1986)
 Fallada: The Last Chapter (1988)
 Nikolaikirche (1995)
  (1995)
 Rosenstrasse (2003)

References

External links

1940 births
Living people
German film actresses
Actresses from Berlin
German television actresses
20th-century German actresses
21st-century German actresses
Members of the Academy of Arts, Berlin
East German actors
East German women